FSUE Research and Development Institute of Mechanical Engineering, also known as NIIMash, is a Russian rocket engine design and manufacturing company specialized in small thrusters. It is located in the city of Nizhnyaya Salda, Sverdlovsk Oblast. It started as the B-175 factory of the NII-1 research institute, where Mikhail G. Mironov directed the development of liquid rocket engines research and testing.

Products
NIIMash has an extensive experience in design of testing stands, measurement and control as well as certifications. They also have a line of custom built air separation plants. They also have extensive experience in rotational forming of metals. The list of space rated products is extensive and is the following:

Current propulsion products
Engines in current production:

Propulsion
Experimental Reactive Control System Module
KDU 11D414NS
Fobos-Grunt Sample Return Spacecraft Propulsion System
Fobos-Grunt Spacecraft Thruster Modules
Thrusters
MD5 ( RDMT-5): Cold gas thruster.
MD08 (a.k.a. RDMT-8): Cold gas thrusters used on the Ekspress satellite series.
MD08-02 (a.k.a. RDMT-8-02): Cold gas thruster: Used on the Fobos-Grunt Sample Return Spacecraft.
11D428A-16 (a.k.a. RDMT-135M):  N2O4/UDMH thruster. Used on the KTDU-80.
11D428AF-16: N2O4/UDMH thrusters used by the Fobos-Grunt space mission.
11D457:  N2O4/UDMH thrusters used by the Resurs-DK No.1.
11D457F:  N2O4/UDMH thrusters used by the Fobos-Grunt space mission.
11D458 (a.k.a. RDMT-400):  N2O4/UDMH thrusters used by the Functional Cargo Block based modules and the Briz upper stage.
11D458F (a.k.a. RDMT-400F):  N2O4/UDMH thrusters used by the Fobos-Grunt space mission.
11D458M (a.k.a. RDMT-400M):  N2O4/UDMH thrusters used by the Briz-M upper stage.
17D16 (a.k.a. RDMT-200K):  GOX/Kerosene thruster. Used the Buran DO thrusters.
17D58E: N2O4/UDMH thrusters used by the Briz-M upper stage.
17D58EF: N2O4/UDMH thrusters used by the Fobos-Grunt space mission.
Experimental thursters
RDMT2600:  Ethanol/GOX thruster designed attitude control when the air density is so low that the control surfaces are ineffective.
RDMT10:  thruster designed for space applications.
Propellant tanks & high pressure gas vessels
Composite high pressure Xenon storage tank: Xenon storage unit for electric propulsion spacecraft.
Composite Vessel: General high pressure vessel used on the Fobos-Grunt mission.
Monopropellant Tank with Stiff-Plastic Separation Device (Diaphragm): Monopropellant storage unit used on the Fobos-Grunt mission.
Bipropellant Tank with Stiff-Plastic Separation Devices (Diaphragms): Bipropellant storage unit used on communications satellites.
Solenoid Valves
RT.200: 
18RT.200: 
16RT.200: 
12RT.200: 
6RT.200:
Flow stabilizers
CP3: /// per second of hypergolic propellant flow.

Former Propulsion Products
Engines that are no longer produced.
RDMT-0.4X: N2O4/UDMH rocket engine.
RDMT-0.8: Nitrogen and helium cold gas thruster.
RDMT-12: N2O4/UDMH rocket engine.
RDMT-50: N2O4/UDMH rocket engine.
RDMT-100: N2O4/UDMH rocket engine.
RDMT-135 (a.k.a. 11D428A):  N2O4/UDMH rocket engine. Used on the Soyuz 7K-S, KTDU-426 and initial KTDU-80.
RDMT-200:  N2O4/UDMH thruster used on the Almaz space stations.
RDMT-400A: Experimental version of the RDMT-200 with Niobium combustion chamber.
RDMT-400X: Experimental version of the RDMT-200 with Carbon combustion chamber.

See also
NII-1 — The research institute where NIIMash started.
Russian Federal Space Agency — The corporate parent of KB KhIMMASH.

References

External links
 NIIMash Official Page

Aerospace companies of the Soviet Union
Rocket engine manufacturers of Russia
Federal State Unitary Enterprises of Russia
Roscosmos divisions and subsidiaries
Companies based in Sverdlovsk Oblast
Engine manufacturers of the Soviet Union
Research institutes in the Soviet Union
1958 establishments in the Soviet Union
Design bureaus